Košarkaški klub Mašinac, commonly referred to as KK Mašinac or simply Mašinac, was a men's professional basketball club based in Kraljevo, Serbia. The club used to compete in the Basketball League of Serbia B.

Notable players

  Nikola Jovanović
  Bojan Kusmuk
  Milan Vučićević
  Oliver Stević
  Aleksandar Radulović
  Slobodan Božović
  Dušan Knežević
  Uroš Mirković
  Nemanja Jelesijević
  Edi Sinadinović
  Miljan Rakić
  Srđan Živković
  Marko Dimitrijević

Head coaches

  Vladimir Androić
  Boško Đokić (2002–2003)
  Miloš Pejić (2005–2006)
  Vladimir Đokić (2009–2010)

External links
 Club Profile at eurobasket.com
 Statistics at srbijasport.net
 Official Website

Defunct basketball teams in Serbia
Basketball teams in Yugoslavia
Basketball teams established in 1982
1982 establishments in Yugoslavia
Basketball teams disestablished in 2013
2013 disestablishments in Serbia